Manushya Mrugam is a 1980 Indian Malayalam-language drama film written by Pappanamkodu Lakshmanan, directed by Baby and produced by Thiruppathi Chettiyar under the banner of Evershine. The film is a remake of the 1975 Kannada film Daari Tappida Maga. The film stars Jayan (double role), Jayaprabha, Seema, Jagathy Sreekumar, Kaviyoor Ponnamma and Jose Prakash. The film has musical score by K. J. Joy. The film was released on 17 December 1980.

Premise
 
The film tells the story of two twin brothers, who were separated in their childhood.

Cast

Jayan as Babu and Gopi
Jayaprabha
Seema
Jagathy Sreekumar
Kaviyoor Ponnamma
Jose Prakash
Manavalan Joseph
Prathapachandran
Janardanan as Chandran
Jayaragini
Jyothi Lakshmi
Master Sandeep
V. P. Nair
Vijayalakshmi

Box office 
The film was commercial success and ran for more than 100 days in many theatres.

Soundtrack
The music was composed by K. J. Joy and the lyrics were written by Pappanamkodu Lakshmanan. All songs were chartbusters, especially the song "Kasthoori Manmizhi", sung by K. J. Yesudas.

References

External links
 

1980 films
1980s Malayalam-language films
Films scored by K. J. Joy
Malayalam remakes of Kannada films
Films directed by Baby (director)